Wu Faqi is a paralympic athlete from China competing mainly in category T46 sprint events.

Wu Faqi was part of the Chinese team at the 2004 Summer Paralympics winning a bronze medal in the individual 400m, he was also a part of the Chinese relay teams in the 4 × 100 m and 4 × 400 m as well as competing in the individual 200m.

References

Paralympic athletes of China
Athletes (track and field) at the 2004 Summer Paralympics
Paralympic bronze medalists for China
Chinese male sprinters
Living people
Medalists at the 2004 Summer Paralympics
Year of birth missing (living people)
Paralympic medalists in athletics (track and field)